Venturini Motorsports is an American professional stock car racing team that currently competes in the ARCA Menards Series, ARCA Menards Series East, and ARCA Menards Series West. Founded in 1982 by Bill Venturini Sr., Venturini Motorsports is the longest continually operated ARCA racing team in the United States. The team is based in Concord, North Carolina.

History
Venturini Motorsports was formed by Bill Venturini Sr., a former NASCAR driver, two-time ARCA Racing Series Champion (1987 and 1991), and 1983 ARCA Rookie of the Year. Largely influenced by his father Tony Venturini, Bill founded the racing team in 1982. The team is family-owned and operated, with various members of the Venturini family holding positions on the team, including CEO, CFO, General Manager, and Director of Marketing and Public Relations. In 2007, Bill's son Billy helped found the Venturini Driver Development Program, one of the largest such programs for ARCA drivers in the United States.

NASCAR
Bill Venturini drove the No. 35 Chevrolet with Rain-X as a sponsor to make its Winston Cup debut at Michigan in 1989, where he started 38th and finished 37th. Between 1982 and 1995, the team had made select starts in the Winston Cup Series, Busch Series, and Craftsman Truck Series with Bill Venturini behind the wheel.

In 2013, the team made its return to the Nationwide Series with driver John Wes Townley and sponsor Zaxby's on the 25 Toyota Camry. The team planned to run at Bristol, Charlotte, and Talladega with the possibility of up to eight more races. Townley finished 17th in his debut at Bristol, crashed at Charlotte, and failed to qualify at Talladega.

It was announced in August 2014 that Venturini would return to the Camping World Truck Series on a part-time basis starting at Bristol with ARCA driver Justin Boston and his sponsor Zloop. Team owner Billy Venturini himself would serve as Boston's crew chief. Boston qualified 27th and finished 30th after a crash. The team planned to run the final three races of the season in preparation for a full-time effort in 2015, but those plans were scrapped when sponsor Zloop shifted their focus to the next season.

Boston and Zloop would move to Kyle Busch Motorsports for 2015. In addition, Venturini would field the No. 25 truck in select races for KBM driver Matt Tifft, Joe Gibbs Racing driver Cody Coughlin, and Venturini road course specialist Brian Wong. The team has not made any scheduled races in 2016.

Various Cup Series, Xfinity Series, and Truck Series drivers, including Joey Logano, Ryan Blaney, Alex Bowman, William Byron, Erik Jones, Daniel Suárez, Brian Scott, Dakoda Armstrong, Justin Marks, Mark Thompson, Scott Lagasse Jr, Brennan Poole, Ryan Reed, Justin Haley, B. J. McLeod, Austin Theriault, Kyle Benjamin, Brandon Jones, Christopher Bell, Noah Gragson, Matt Tifft, Spencer Davis, Cole Rouse, and Tanner Thorson are former drivers for Venturini Motorsports.

ARCA Menards Series
Venturini Motorsports currently has five active drivers in the ARCA Menards Series. Various NASCAR Cup Series drivers, including Joey Logano, Ryan Blaney, Alex Bowman, William Byron, Erik Jones and Daniel Suárez, are former drivers for Venturini Motorsports.

Car No. 8 history
Marc Davis (2008)
Marc Davis drove the No. 8 in one race in 2008.

Car No. 14 history
Tom Berte (2008)
Tom Berte drove a No. 14 for one race in 2008.

Car No. 15 history
Multiple Drivers (2008)
The No. 15 drove in six races in 2008, all with different drivers, including the 2018 and 2022 NASCAR Cup Series champion, Joey Logano.
Multiple Drivers (2010-2018)
Venturini entered the No. 15 for eighteen races in 2010 and sixteen races in 2011. Ryan Reed drove fourteen of the nineteen races from the No. 15 in 2012. Kyle Benjamin and John Wes Townley drove eleven of the twenty-one races in 2013 for the No. 15. Townley would end up driving fifteen of the twenty races in the No. 15 in 2014. Only eight races in 2015 entered the No. 15. Daniel Suárez and even the legendary Frank Kimmel drove it. Sixteen races entered the No. 15 in 2016. For 2017, soon-to-be the 2019 series champion, Christian Eckes drove the No. 15 with other drivers. 2018 had twenty races run.
Christian Eckes (2019)

Eckes drove the No. 15 car to a championship in 2019. He became the first driver since Tim Steele in 1997 to win a championship while you miss a race because Harrison Burton raced one race in the No. 15 while Eckes drove the other nineteen.
Drew Dollar (2020)
After Eckes was promoted to the NASCAR Gander RV & Outdoors Truck Series in 2020, Drew Dollar was promoted from the West Series to the ARCA Menards Series in 2020, finishing third and fourteenth in the first two races before the 2019-20 coronavirus pandemic stopped NASCAR from being public. Though he won at Talladega and finished fourth in points, he left to drive part-time in the Truck Series and part-time here.

Multiple Drivers (2021-2022)

Drew Dollar is slated to run 11 national series raced in 2021. Gracie Trotter was promoted from the ARCA West Series to the ARCA Menards Series on a part-time schedule for 5 races.

In 2022, Parker Chase, Gus Dean, Jonathan Shafer, and Landon Pembelton will split the seat time.

Car No. 20 history
Multiple Drivers (2017-present)
Zane Smith and Tom Berte both drove the No. 20 in three races with Smith driving two and Berte one. Drivers such as Leilani Münter and Chandler Smith drove the No. 20 in 2018. Five drivers shared the No. 20 in 2019. Ryan Repko and Chandler Smith shared the No. 20 in 2020.

Corey Heim (2021)

Corey Heim will drive the 20 full-time in 2021. Corey won the Lucas Oil 200 (ARCA) that year.

Jesse Love (2022)

Jesse Love ran the No. 20 in 14 races in 2022, excluding 6 events which Corey Heim ran.

Car No. 25 history
Multiple Drivers (2008)
Sixteen races were run by five different drivers in 2008.
Mikey Kile (2010)
Mikey Kile moved from running a limited basis in Brad Keselowski Racing in 2009 to drive the No. 25 in 2010 full-time winning a race at Michigan and finishing fifth in points.
Multiple Drivers (2011)
Ten drivers drove in the No. 25 in 2011.
Brennan Poole (2012)
Poole would drive the No. 25 in 2012 full-time earning fifteen top tens, three poles, and two wins back-to-back at Elko Speedway and Pocono Raceway to finish third in points before deciding to race part-time for the next two years.
Justin Boston (2013-2014)

To replace Poole, Venturini got Justin Boston to race the No. 25 in 2013, with his sponsor, Zloop. His highest finish was second at Madison Speedway. That was one of his eight top-fives that season. He ended up getting the Rookie Of The Year honors and finished third in the standings behind Mason Mingus and Frank Kimmel. He drove the No. 25 again in 2014. Although he got two wins at Toledo and Madison, he finished fifth in points for 2014. He left the No. 25 in 2015 to drive two more races in ARCA in Venturini's No. 55. 
Frank Kimmel And Brandon Jones (2015)
Both drivers drove ten races in 2015, with Kimmel finishing thirteenth in points to Jones finishing fifteenth. Kimmel's highest finish was second at Michigan and Jones’ highest finish was also second but at Mobile.
Tom Hessert (2016)
After Jones and Kimmel left, Tom Hessert was picked up to drive the No. 25 for 2016. He won one race at DeQuoin and ended up finishing second in points to Hessert's replacement at Cunningham Motorsports, Chase Briscoe.
Multiple Drivers (2017)
Hessert drove part-time along with a couple of other drivers including Natalie Decker.
Natalie Decker (2018)
Decker was assigned to drive full-time in 2018. She got two top fives at the season opener and Elko. She was then promoted to the Truck Series after finishing seventh in points for Venturini in the 2018 season.
Michael Self (2019-2020)

Michael Self replaced Decker after he got some wins driving part-time. After wrecking in the season opener, he retaliated by winning the next two races. He won two more races and finished second behind his teammate in points, Christian Eckes. In 2020, he won the season opener and finished second in the next race before the 2019-20 coronavirus pandemic held up the rest of the season.

Multiple Drivers (2021)

Gracie Trotter was promoted from the Arca West Series to the ARCA Menards Series on a part-time schedule for 4 races beginning at the Lucas Oil 200. Jesse Love will also race this car for 9 races, while 7 races are still TBD.

Toni Breidinger (2022)

In 2022, Toni Breidinger will run this car full-time.

Car No. 28 history
Miguel Paludo (2011)
The No. 28 only ran one race, with Miguel Paludo at the season opener, finishing thirteenth.

Car No. 35 history
Multiple Drivers (2010, 2012)
The No. 35 was first run in 2010 with it only being driven in six races. After not racing in 2011, the No. 35 was revived in 2012 for a full-time season with part-time drivers.
Milka Duno (2013)
Venturini hired Milka Duno for her first and only full-time season in 2013. She even got a pole at the Talladega race, leading the first eleven laps before wrecking out. Her highest finish was eighth at Salem. After finishing almost all her races in the top twenty, she finished seventh in points. This was the last year the No. 35 raced.

Car No. 47 history
Tom Berte (2008)
The No. 47 only ran two races in 2008. Tom Berte drove both of them. The No. 47 has not run since.

Car No. 48 history
Tom Berte (2008)
The No. 48 only ran one race, with Tom Berte in 2008.

Car No. 55 history
Multiple Drivers (2010-2017)

In 2010, Steve Arpin eighteen races while two others filled the others. In 2011, ten drivers shared the car, including current Cup Series drivers, Alex Bowman, and Brennan Poole. In 2012, Erik Jones drove most of the races before finishing twenty-first in points. In 2013, Taylor Ferns drove the most out of the ten drivers sharing the No. 55. Cody Coughlin would drive the most races in 2014. Coughlin again would share the No. 55 in 2015 with Cup Series drivers such as, William Byron and Daniel Suárez. In 2016, Dalton Sargeant drove the most races with fifteen in the No. 55. Zane Smith would drive the most races for the No. 55 team in 2017. 
Corey Heim (2020)
In 2020, Venturini announced Corey Heim will drive their No. 55 part-time in 2020.

Derek Griffith (2021)

Derek will drive the 55 for two races in 2021. One of these races was the Lucas Oil 200.

Gus Dean (2022)

Dean will drive the 55 for at least five races in 2022. One of these races was the Lucas Oil 200.

Car No. 66 history
Mark Thompson (2010-2012)
Thompson would drive the No. 66 in only two races in 2010, the season opener where he finished second, and at Talladega where he finished 25th. In 2011, he raced in two races again, at the opener, finishing seventeenth, and at Chicago, finishing thirty-fourth. 2012 was the only season the No. 66 was raced full-time. In 2012, he finished fifth in the season opener, fourteenth at Talladega, and twenty-fourth at Chicago. The No. 66 did not run in 2013.
Multiple Drivers (2014)
Ten drivers shared the No. 66 in 2014.
Leilani Münter (2015)
Leilani drove the No. 66 in one race, wrecking out at the season opener, finishing 38th.
Multiple Drivers (2016)
Five races were run in 2015, with Mark Thompson running two while the other three drove one.

Recent wins

In 2006, the team ended a 12-year winless streak when Billy Venturini won the Kentuckiana Ford Dealers ARCA 200 by Federated Auto Parts.

Since 2006, Venturini Motorsports drivers have won 41 races:

1. Kentuckiana Ford Dealers 200 by Federated Auto Parts won by Billy Venturini on April 23, 2006.
2. Carolina 500 won by Joey Logano on May 4, 2008.
3. Chicagoland ARCA 150 won by Scott Lagasse Jr. on September 6, 2008.
4. ARCA Re/Max Carolina 200 won by Sean Caisse on April 19, 2009.
5. Pocono ARCA 200 was won by Joey Logano on June 6, 2009.
6. Kentuckiana Ford Dealers 200 won by Steve Arpin on April 11, 2010.
7. Rattlesnake 150 was won by Steve Arpin on April 16, 2010.
8. Racing For Wildlife 200 was won by Mikey Kile on June 11, 2010.
9. Southern Illinois 100 won by Steve Arpin on September 6, 2010.
10. Kentuckiana Ford Dealers 200 won by Brennan Poole on May 1, 2011.
11. Herr's Live Life With Flavor! 200 won by Alex Bowman on August 26, 2011.
12. Kansas Lottery 98.9 won by Alex Bowman on October 7, 2011.
13. Akona 200 Presented By Federated Car Care won by Brennan Poole on June 2, 2012.
14. Pocono ARCA 200 was won by Brennan Poole on June 9, 2012.
15. Ansell Activarmr® 150 won by Kevin Swindell on July 21, 2012.
16. Lucas Oil 200 Presented By Mavtv American Real won by John Wes Townley on February 16, 2013.
17. Michigan ARCA 200 was won by Brennan Poole on June 14, 2013.
18. Berlin ARCA 200 was won by Erik Jones on August 10, 2013.
19. Allen Crowe 100 won by Brennan Poole on August 18, 2013.
20. Madison ARCA 200 won by Kyle Benjamin on August 25, 2013.
21. Kentuckiana Ford Dealers ARCA Fall Classic won by Kyle Benjamin on September 14, 2013.
22. Menards 200 Presented By Federated Car Care won by Justin Boston on May 18, 2014.
23. Michigan ARCA 200 won by Austin Theriault on June 13, 2014.
24. SuperChevyStores.com 100 was won by Kevin Swindell on August 17, 2014.
25. Herr's Live Life With Flavor 200 was won by Justin Boston on August 24, 2014.
26. ZLOOP 150 won by Brennan Poole on September 19, 2014.
27. Menards 200 Presented By Federated Car Care won by Todd Gilliland on May 17, 2015.
28. Kentuckiana Ford Dealers 200 won by Christopher Bell on April 24, 2016.
29. Berlin ARCA 200 was won by Dalton Sargeant on August 6, 2016.
30. General Tire Grabber 100 won by Tom Hessert on September 4, 2016.
31. Eddie Gilstrap Motors Fall Classic was won by Christopher Bell on September 10, 2016.
32. Scott 150 won by Christopher Bell on September 14, 2017.
33. Lucas Oil 200 Driven by General Tire won by Michael Self on February 10, 2018.
34. Kentuckiana Ford Dealers 200 won by Christian Eckes on April 22, 2018.
35. Herr's Potato Chips 200 was won by Chandler Smith on June 15, 2018.
36. Scott 150 won by Michael Self on June 28, 2018.
37. Allen Crowe 100 won by Christian Eckes on August 19, 2018.
38. General Tire Grabber 100 won by Logan Seavey on September 3, 2018.
39. Kentuckiana Ford Dealers ARCA Fall Classic won by Chandler Smith on September 15, 2018.
40. Shore Lunch 200 was won by Christian Eckes on October 6, 2018.
41. Lucas Oil 200 Driven by General Tire won by Harrison Burton on February 9, 2019.
42. ARCA Pensacola 200 won by Michael Self on March 9, 2019
43. Kentuckiana Ford Dealers 200 won by Michael Self on April 14, 2019
44. Lucas Oil 200 Driven by General Tire won by Michael Self on February 8, 2020
45. General Tire 150 won by Chandler Smith on March 6, 2020
46. General Tire 200 won by Drew Dollar on June 20, 2020
47. General Tire 100 won by Michael Self on August 14, 2020.
48. Speediatrics 150 won by Corey Heim on October 16, 2020.
49. Lucas Oil 200 won by Corey Heim on February 13, 2021
50. General Tire 200 won by Corey Heim on April 24, 2021
51. General Tire #AnywhereIsPossible 200 won by Corey Heim on June 25, 2021
52. Menards 250 won by Corey Heim on July 10, 2021
53. Clean Harbors 100 at The Glen won by Corey Heim on August 6, 2021

References

External links
 
Bill Venturini Owner Statistics - Racing-Reference.info
Billy Venturini Owner Statistics - Racing-Reference.info

NASCAR teams
ARCA Menards Series teams